Sherlock Holmes is the overall title given to the series of Sherlock Holmes adaptations produced by the British television company Granada Television between 1984 and 1994. The first two series were shown under the title The Adventures of Sherlock Holmes and were followed by subsequent series with the titles of other short story collections by Sir Arthur Conan Doyle.

Of the 60 Holmes stories written by Doyle, 43  were adapted in the series, spanning 36 one-hour episodes and five feature-length specials. (Episode 40 incorporates the plot lines of both "The Adventure of the Mazarin Stone" and "The Adventure of the Three Garridebs". Episode 35 "The Eligible Bachelor" has material from both "The Adventure of the Noble Bachelor" and "The Adventure of the Veiled Lodger".)

The series was broadcast on the ITV network in the UK and starred Jeremy Brett as Holmes. Watson was played by David Burke in the first series (Adventures) and by Edward Hardwicke from the second series (Return) onwards.

Plot
In the late Victorian era, Sherlock Holmes is the world's only consulting detective. His practice is largely with private clients, but he is also known to assist the police, often in the shape of Inspector Lestrade, when their cases overlap. His clients range from private citizens of modest means to members of royalty. His ability to spot clues easily overlooked by others, bring certain specialist knowledge — for example chemistry, botany, anatomy – and deductive reasoning to bear on problems enable him to solve the most complex cases. He is assisted in his work by military veteran Dr. John Watson, with whom he shares rooms at 221B Baker Street. He craves mental stimulation, and is known to relapse into depression when there are insufficiently complex cases to engage him.

Cast

Main 
 Jeremy Brett as Sherlock Holmes (1984–1994). Brett had earlier portrayed Dr Watson on stage in the Los Angeles production of The Crucifer of Blood. Brett’s portrayal remains very popular and is accepted by many as definitive.
 David Burke as Dr. Watson (1984–1985). He earlier played the villain "The Adventure of the Beryl Coronet" for the 1965 BBC series (starring Douglas Wilmer and Nigel Stock). He left to join the Royal Shakespeare Company.
 Edward Hardwicke as Dr. Watson (1986–1994). He earlier had a role in an adaptation of "The Greek Interpreter" for the 1968 BBC series
 Rosalie Williams as Mrs Hudson (1984–1994)

Supporting 
 Colin Jeavons as Inspector Lestrade (1985–1992). He also played Moriarty in The Baker Street Boys (1982)
 Eric Porter as Professor Moriarty (1985–1986). He appeared in "The Red-Headed League", "The Final Problem" and "The Empty House". Archive footage was also used for "The Devil's Foot" and "The Eligible Bachelor".
 Charles Gray as Mycroft Holmes (1985, 1988, 1994). Played the same character in the 1976 film The Seven-Per-Cent Solution
Brian Miller as Inspector Bradstreet on "The Blue Carbuncle" (1984), 
 Denis Lill as Inspector Bradstreet (1986, 1988, 1994) on "The Man with the Twisted Lip", "The Bruce-Partington Plans" and "The Mazarin Stone"
 John Labonowski as Inspector Athelney Jones in "The Red-Headed League" (1985)
 Emrys James as Inspector Athelney Jones in "The Sign of Four" (1987)
 Paul Williamson as Inspector Stanley Hopkins in "The Abbey Grange" (1986)
 Nigel Planer as Inspector Stanley Hopkins in "The Adventure of the Golden Pince-Nez" (1994)
 Tom Chadbon as Inspector Hawkins in "The Red Circle" and "The Cardboard Box" (1994)

The role of the servant Joe Barnes who impersonates Lady Beatrice in the 1991 episode "Shoscombe Old Place" was played by Jude Law, who later played Dr. Watson in the 2009 film Sherlock Holmes and its 2011 sequel Sherlock Holmes: A Game of Shadows.

Freddie Jones made two guest appearances in the show as different characters, appearing in "Wisteria Lodge" as Inspector Baynes and "The Last Vampyre" as a pedlar. Michael Wynne also made two guest appearances in the show as different characters, appearing in "Shoscombe Old Place" as Josiah Barnes and "The Mazarin Stone" as Commissionare Jenkins. Helen Ryan also made two guest appearances in the show as different characters, appearing in "The Norwood Builder" as Mrs McFarlane, and in "The Mazarin Stone" as the Princess of Wales (a role she previously played in Edward the Seventh).

Episodes 

The programme ran for four series and 41 episodes: 36 ran for 50 minutes, and 5 were feature-length specials.

Production 

The series was initially produced by Michael Cox, with later episodes produced by June Wyndham Davies. It was developed for television by screenwriter John Hawkesworth, who also wrote many of the episodes (all based on individual Doyle stories). Other writers to adapt Doyle's short stories in the series included Alexander Baron, Jeremy Paul, T. R. Bowen, and Alan Plater.

Brett had been approached in February 1982 by Granada to play Holmes. The idea was to make a totally authentic and faithful adaptation of the character's best cases. Eventually Brett accepted the role and was very attentive to discrepancies between the scripts he had been given and Doyle's original stories.

To shoot the series, a full-scale outdoor replica of Baker Street was constructed at Granada's studios in Quay Street, Manchester, which later formed a central part of the Granada Studios Tour tourist attraction, before that venue's closure in 1999.

The series came to an end owing to the death of Brett at the age of 61 from heart failure in 1995. He had suffered from ill health during filming of the later series due to adverse reactions to the medicine prescribed for depression. It was an affliction he was prone to, episodically, throughout his life. In his later life, it worsened.

Unadapted stories 
Though the Granada series is one of the most comprehensive screen adaptations of the Holmes canon, it nevertheless left 19 stories unadapted after Brett's  death. These stories comprise two of the novels and 17 of the short stories:

 A Study in Scarlet
 "A Case of Identity"
 "The Five Orange Pips"
 "The Adventure of the Engineer's Thumb"
 "The Adventure of the Beryl Coronet"
 "The Adventure of the Yellow Face"
 "The Adventure of the Stockbroker's Clerk"
 "The Adventure of the Gloria Scott"
 "The Adventure of the Reigate Squire"
 "The Adventure of Black Peter"
 "The Adventure of the Three Students"
 "The Adventure of the Missing Three-Quarter"
 The Valley of Fear
 "His Last Bow"
 "The Adventure of the Blanched Soldier"
 "The Adventure of the Three Garridebs" (Although the main theme of this story is present in "The Mazarin Stone")
 "The Adventure of the Lion's Mane"
 "The Adventure of the Veiled Lodger" (Although elements of this story are present in "The Eligible Bachelor")
 "The Adventure of the Retired Colourman"

Other productions 
During 1988–1989, Brett and Hardwicke appeared in a West End play, The Secret of Sherlock Holmes, a two-hander written specially for them by the television series screenwriter Jeremy Paul.

In May 1992, Brett and Hardwicke appeared in a mini-episode (about ten minutes in length) as part of The Four Oaks Mystery, shown as part of the ITV Telethon 92 charity telethon. This episode formed the first of a four-part sequence of stories featuring the stars of four ITV detective shows of the time all separately working to solve the same mystery, broadcast at two episodes a night across one weekend. The other shows that produced mini-episodes for the special were Van der Valk, Taggart, and Inspector Wexford.

Broadcast 
As well as being broadcast by ITV in the UK, the series was also seen overseas, particularly in the United States, where the episodes initially ran on PBS stations in the Mystery! strand. Later series gained co-production funding from Boston PBS broadcaster WGBH. The shows have also been transmitted on two US cable television stations, Disney Channel and A&E Network, the Seven Network in Australia and on CBC in Canada.

In the UK, the series has often been repeated: on Granada Plus; on ITV3; ITV4; and on BBC Two, which ran the complete series on Saturday afternoons from 2003 to 2005. This makes it one of the very few programmes originally produced by an ITV company for broadcast on their own channel to have subsequently been shown on the BBC. In March 2006, the series returned to its original channel for the first time in over a decade, as part of the daytime television line-up on weekday afternoons.

Reception 
The series is considered to present the most faithful screen adaptations of many of the Holmes stories, although liberties were taken with some plotlines and characters, particularly later in the run during the 1990s episodes (for instance The Mazarin Stone, filmed in 1994, combined the plot elements of two separate Doyle stories).

A big change was Holmes quitting his cocaine habit in the episode "The Devil's Foot," which was done with the approval of Jean Conan Doyle, Doyle's daughter, when it was discovered that the series had a considerable child audience. Nonetheless, the series has been highly praised for the performance of Brett, its adherence to Doyle's original concept in the characterisation of Watson, its high production values, and its close attention to period detail.

Home media
The series has been released on DVD in Regions 1, 2 and 4, and has been repeated on ITV4 and BBC Two.

The complete series has also been released on VHS and on DVD, twice on the latter, with the most recent 2005 release taking advantage of the digitally remastered film prints originally prepared for the BBC Two repeat run. In December 2012, the series was released on Blu-ray in Japan, in Spain in May 2013, in France in October 2013, and in the US in September 2014.

Region 1
MPI Home Video has released the entire series on DVD in Region 1, in various incarnations.  MPI released The Adventures & The Return in single disc volumes as well as complete collections.  The Casebook & The Memoirs were released as a single collection box sets.  In addition, on 25 September 2007, a complete series set was released featuring all 41 episodes in one complete collection for the very first time.

Region 2
ITV DVD has released the entire series in various collections as well as a complete series box set.

The Complete Collection mentioned above has English subtitles only. The complete series was released on Blu-ray in Spain in 2013. Though native to Spain, the 10 disc set is region-free and thus can be played in any region of the world. The Complete Collection was released a second time on Blu-ray in Germany in 2016. It has German subtitles only but German and English soundtracks. This is a 14 disc set and is marked region 'B'.

Notes

References

Bibliography 
 Peter Haining, The Television Sherlock Holmes, W.H. Allen, London, 1986. .
 Keith Frankel, "Granada's Greatest Detective, a Guide to the classic Sherlock Holmes television series", Fantom Publishing, Coventry England 2016. .

External links
The Saga of the Sherlock Holmes Granada TV Series at arthur-conan-doyle.com

Interview with producer June Wyndham Davies (1996)
Jeremy Brett: Interview (1988), retrieved 7 January 2018

1980s British drama television series
1990s British drama television series
1984 British television series debuts
1994 British television series endings
ITV mystery shows
Television series set in the 19th century
Sherlock Holmes television series
Television shows based on British novels
Television series by ITV Studios
Television shows produced by Granada Television
Television shows set in London
English-language television shows
1980s British mystery television series
1990s British mystery television series